Rick Salutin (born August 30, 1942) is a Canadian novelist, playwright, journalist, and critic and has been writing for more than forty years. Until October 1, 2010, he wrote a regular column in The Globe and Mail; on February 11, 2011, he began a weekly column in the Toronto Star.

He currently teaches a half course on Canadian media and culture in University College (CDN221) at the University of Toronto. He is a contributing editor of This Magazine. He received his Bachelor of Arts degree in Near Eastern and Jewish Studies at Brandeis University and got his Master of Arts degree in religion at Columbia University. He also studied philosophy at the New School for Social Research in New York City. He was once a trade union organizer in Toronto and participated in the Artistic Woodwork strike.

Salutin is interested in communication and has praised Harold Innis, an economist who taught at the University of Toronto and conceived of the staples thesis, for his outlook in communications. Salutin has a child with The Fifth Estate journalist Theresa Burke, whom he has cited as the model for the characters Amy Bert and Antia in The Womanizer.

Journalism
Salutin has written in many magazines, including Harpers,  Maclean's, Canadian Business, Toronto Life, Weekend, Saturday Night, Quest, TV Times, Today, and This Magazine. He wrote "The Culture Vulture" column for many years in This Magazine and received National Newspaper awards for it. He won the National Newspaper Award for best columnist for a column he wrote in The Globe and Mail.

He introduced cartoon strips to This Magazine and convinced Margaret Atwood to regularly collaborate. She made a cartoon strip called "Kanadian Kultchur Komics".

In Waiting for Democracy: A Citizen's Journal (1989), he expresses his thoughts on the federal election in 1989 and writes about interviewing people before the election.

Drama
Salutin has an interest in drama and performing arts. His first play, Fanshen, unpublished, was adapted from William Hinton's book Fanshen and was produced by Toronto Workshop Productions. The Adventures of an Immigrant shows that he is concerned about poverty and other hardships in Western society. His unpublished Maria was a drama on CBC Television about a woman fighting to put factory workers in the union.

His first published play was 1837: The Farmers' Revolt about the revolt led by William Lyon Mackenzie. This play was created at Theatre Passe Muraille and produced on CBC Television in 1975. 1837 won the Chalmers award for best Canadian play in 1977.

His most successful play, Les Canadiens (1977), written with help from  goaltender Ken Dryden, won him the Chalmers Outstanding Play award.

Salutin helped found the Guild of Canadian Playwrights and in 1978 became chairman. Another play he wrote is Joey (1981).

Novels
His first novel, A Man of Little Faith, is about a religious man discovering himself in a Jewish community. It received the W.H. Smith Books in Canada First Novel Award. His books Marginal Notes: Challenges to the Mainstream and Living in a Dark Age are based on many of his articles from This Magazine. He won the Toronto Arts award for writing and publishing.

Book review
Taken from a book review of The Womanizer: "It's both lively and witty, but not as light as it might seem on first glance."

Published writing

Books 
Kent Rowley: A Canadian Union Life - 1980
Marginal Notes: Challenges to the Mainstream - 1984
Good Buy Canada! - 1975 (with Murray Soupcoff and Gary Dunford)A Man of Little Faith - 1988 (winner of the 1989 Books in Canada First Novel Award)Waiting for Democracy - 1989Living in a Dark Age - 1991The Age of Improv - 1995The Womanizer - 2002

 Plays 1837: The Farmers' Revolt - 1976, with Paul ThompsonLes Canadiens'' - 1977

Literature

See also 
 List of Canadian playwrights

References 

1942 births
Living people
Canadian columnists
Canadian male novelists
Canadian social commentators
Journalists from Toronto
Writers from Toronto
20th-century Canadian dramatists and playwrights
20th-century Canadian novelists
21st-century Canadian novelists
Academic staff of the University of Toronto
Canadian male dramatists and playwrights
20th-century Canadian male writers
21st-century Canadian male writers
Canadian male non-fiction writers
Jewish Canadian journalists
Amazon.ca First Novel Award winners